The Niaosong Wetland Park ( is a park in Niaosong District, Kaohsiung, Taiwan.

History
The wetland was declared in February 1995. In June 1999, Kaohsiung County Magistrate Yu Cheng-hsien officiated the groundbreaking ceremony of the wetland construction. The construction was then completed in June 2000 and was inaugurated on 24 September 2000. On 24 October 2002, the Kaohsiung Wild Bird Society was officially appointed to manage the park. Works for desilting and dredging of the bottom of the settling basin and the small pond of the wetland was carried out from 25 October 2007 until 25 January 2008. In March 2010, works for desilting and dredging for the big pond was carried out which was completed on 9 July 2010.

Geography
The park is a triangular shape of land with 3 hectares of area, including 2 hectares of water area forming a wetland of pool pond type. It has a diverse terrain and landscape, as well as various animal species. There have been 89 bird species, 280 insect species and 300 plant species which have been recorded.

Events
Various events had been held at the park, such as the Niaosong Wetland Park Eco-festival, Pals of Niaosong Wetland Park, Niaosong Wetland Park Eco-festival, Ecology Volunteer Training of Niaosong Wetland Park, The Propagation Program of Pushing Forward the Protection of Wildlife and It's Biodiversity in Niaosong Wetland Park, The Propagation Program of Ecology Protection of Niaosong Wetland Park, Little Eco-festival of Niaosong Wetland Park etc.

See also
 List of parks in Taiwan

References

1995 establishments in Taiwan
Parks established in 1995
Parks in Kaohsiung
Wetlands of Taiwan